Marchetti Glacier is a glacier flowing from the north slope of Mount Mahony, in the Saint Johns Range of Victoria Land, into Cotton Glacier. It was named by the Advisory Committee on Antarctic Names in 2007 after Peter Anthony Marchetti (Tony), who made 33 deployments to McMurdo Sound in the period 1987–2021, including seven winters; he was the camp manager for the US Antarctic Program’s Telecommunications Facility on Black Island in the Ross Archipelago for 26 austral summers from 1996.

References

Glaciers of Victoria Land